Mattie Forde is an Irish Gaelic footballer from Ballyfad, County Wexford, Ireland. He formerly played at senior level for the Wexford county team and received an All Star in 2004. He plays his club football for Kilanerin–Ballyfad, and also plays hurling for the club.

Forde established himself as one of the top forwards in the game, regularly racking up high scores.

He is his county's top scorer in National Football League history, finishing his career with 29–299 (386) in that competition.

He announced his retirement from inter-county football in January 2011.

Football

Inter-county
Forde had an excellent year in 2004. He was top scorer in that year's National League, with a total of 8-36 (60 points). His excellent form continued in the Championship and he helped steer Wexford to their first Leinster Championship semi-final since 1994, where they lost out to Westmeath. He scored an impressive 2-10 in a subsequent qualifier victory over Offaly, before Wexford made their Championship after a 3rd qualifying round defeat to Derry. Forde was the Championship's top scorer with 3-38 (47). He was awarded an All Star for his performances that year and in doing so became the first Wexfordman to ever receive an All Star. He was also named GPA Footballer of the Year.

In 2005, Forde was again top scorer in the National League, helping Wexford reach the final, where they lost to Armagh. He reached another Leinster semi-final with Wexford, where they narrowly lost out to Dublin, before bowing out to Monaghan in the qualifiers.

The following year Forde was top scorer in Division 1 of the National League, but Wexford were still relegated. In the Championship he scored 0-12 to help Wexford beat Meath. In the subsequent Leinster semi-final against Offaly, Forde scored 1-07, but were still defeated. However, during the game he was involved in a stamping incident, where he stamped down on the back of the head of Offaly's Shane Sullivan. The referee did not see the incident and Forde was allowed to play on, but the incident was caught on camera. While Forde did play in the following Saturday's qualifier victory over Monaghan, in which he was top scorer with 0-06, he was later given a three-month suspension at a meeting of the GAA's Central Disciplinary Committee a week later, and ruled out of Wexford's third round qualifier meeting with Fermanagh, which they subsequently lost.

2007 was a disappointing year for Wexford, where they failed to gain promotion from Division 3 of the restructured National League and lost out to Laois in the Leinster semi-final, before bowing out to Fermanagh in the qualifiers.

The following year proved to be a much more successful year for the county. Wexford won Division 3 of the National League, beating Fermanagh in the final. Having beaten Meath and Laois, they reached that year's Leinster Championship final, but were comprehensively beaten by Dublin. However subsequent victoires over Down and Armagh, meant Wexford reached the All-Ireland semi-final. In the semi-final they lost to eventual All-Ireland champions Tyrone. Forde had to be substituted due to injury at half-time, and many felt if he had still been on the pitch the result may have been different. Forde was in excellent form throughout the year, kicking vital scores.

In January 2011, Forde confirmed his retirement from inter-county football. In February 2013, he said he would not be returning.

He later made a return to the Wexford colours with the county junior team, with whom he won a Leinster Junior Football Championship in 2016.

Club
Forde has won the Wexford Senior Football Championship 4 times with Kilanerin, being chosen as man-of-the - match in 2 of the finals. He won a Leinster Intermediate Club Football Championship in 2016. He also plays hurling with the club, and was also man-of-the - match when they won the Intermediate title in 2003.

International rules
Forde represented Ireland in the International Rules Series in 2004 and 2005.

Province
Forde has played for Leinster on a number of occasions. He was in the side that reached the 2004 Railway Cup final. A year later Forde was on the team that went one step further and won the competition, beating Ulster in the final.

Rugby
Forde used to play rugby with local side Gorey RFC in Leinster League Division 4 Section D.

References

External links
 cul4kidz profile

Year of birth missing (living people)
Living people
Dual players
Gaelic football forwards
Gaelic footballers who switched code
Irish international rules football players
Kilanerin Gaelic footballers
Kilanerin hurlers
Wexford inter-county Gaelic footballers